Eclipse Award for Outstanding Breeder is an American Thoroughbred horse racing honor for breeders. Created in 1971, it is part of the Eclipse Awards program and is awarded annually.

Its Canadian counterpart is the Sovereign Award for Outstanding Breeder.

Past winners: 
1971 : Paul Mellon
1972 : C. T. Chenery
1973 : C. T. Chenery
1974 : John W. Galbreath
1975 : Fred W. Hooper
1976 : Nelson Bunker Hunt
1977 : E. P. Taylor
1978 : Harbor View Farm
1979 : Claiborne Farm
1980 : Adele W. Paxson
1981 : Golden Chance Farm
1982 : Fred W. Hooper
1983 : E. P. Taylor
1984 : Claiborne Farm
1985 : Nelson Bunker Hunt
1986 : Paul Mellon
1987 : Nelson Bunker Hunt
1988 : Ogden Phipps
1989 : North Ridge Farm
1990 : Calumet Farm
1991 : John & Betty Mabee
1992 : William S. Farish III
1993 : Allen E. Paulson
1994 : William T. Young
1995 : Juddmonte Farms
1996 : Farnsworth Farms
1997 : John & Betty Mabee
1998 : John & Betty Mabee
1999 : William S. Farish III
2000 : Frank Stronach
2001 : Juddmonte Farms
2002 : Juddmonte Farms
2003 : Juddmonte Farms
2004 : Adena Springs Farms
2005 : Adena Springs Farms
2006 : Adena Springs Farms
2007 : Adena Springs Farms
2008 : Adena Springs Farms
2009 : Juddmonte Farms
2010 : Adena Springs Farms
2011 : Adena Springs Farms
2012 : Darley Stud
2013 : Kenneth and Sarah Ramsey
2014 : Kenneth and Sarah Ramsey
2015 : Zayat Stables
2016 : WinStar Farm
2017 : Clearsky Farms
2018 : John D. Gunther
2019 : George Strawbridge Jr.
2020 : WinStar Farm
2021 : Godolphin
2022 : Godolphin

References
 The Eclipse Awards at the Thoroughbred Racing Associations of America, Inc.
 The Bloodhorse.com Champion's history charts

 
Horse racing awards
Horse racing in the United States